The denomination Cathedral of the Most Holy Trinity may refer to:
Cathedral of the Most Holy Trinity, Bermuda (Anglican)
Cathedral of the Most Holy Trinity, Buenos Aires (Russian Orthodox)
Co-Cathedral Basilica of the Most Holy Trinity, Chełmża, Poland (Roman Catholic)
Cathedral of the Most Holy Trinity, Huancayo, Peru (Roman Catholic)
Cathedral of the Most Holy Trinity, Montevideo (Anglican)
Cathedral of the Most Holy Trinity, Waterford (Roman Catholic)
Cathedral of the Most Holy Trinity (Daet), Philippines (Roman Catholic)
Cathedral of the Most Holy Trinity (Talibon), Philippines (Roman Catholic)